The Nüzi canzheng tongmenghui was a Chinese women's rights organisation, founded 20 February 1912. Its purpose was to work for the introduction of women's rights and women suffrage.  It was the first national women's suffrage organisation in China, and the start of the first organised suffrage movement in China.

Foundation
It was founded by Tang Qunying (founder of the av Women's Support Association) in Nanjing 20 February 1912. At the time, the Chinese Empire had been abolished and the Constitution of the new Republic of China was due to be written. Women activists were concerned that women's equal rights and suffrage be included in the constitution of the new republic. When there were signs that this was not the case, women organized under Tang Qunying to lobby their cause to the Parliament. It was an umbrella organisation which comprised the women's associations Nüzi canzheng tongzhi hui, Nüzi shang wu hui, Nüzi houyuan hui, Hunan nuguomin hui and Nüzi tongmenghui, and among its founding members were Zhang Hanying, Lin Zongsu (chair of the Shanghai Women's Political Consultative Conference), Wang Changguo (promoter of Hunan Changsha Women's National Association), Shen Peizhen (chair of the Shanghai Women's Shangwu Association), Chen Hongbi (chair of the Shanghai Aihua Company), Wu Mulan (chair of the Shanghai Women's League),  Zhang "Sophie" Zhaohan, He Xiangning and Cai Hui, with Tang Qunying as its president.

Activity
When the new constitution was presented to the parliament 11 March 1912 and did not include women suffrage, the suffragists left their seats in the gallery and stormed the parliamentary sets in demonstration. The next day, they were barred from entering and organised a demonstration to protest. On April 1912, they organised a congress and printed a manifesto of suffrage which was distributed across China. When male suffrage was passed in parliament 10 August 1912, sixty suffragists stormed the parliament in protest. 

President Sun Yat-sen supported the demands of the organisation, but informed Tang Qunying that despite his personal support, it was impossible to get her demands through parliament because the majority was against them, and advised her to view women suffrage a long term goal which had to be postponed, and instead focus on making women ready for suffrage at a later date by making better education available for them. President Yuan Shikai proved to be much more hostile to women's rights: in March 1913, he banned the Nüzi canzheng tongmenghui and issued an arrest warrant for Tang Qunying, which was to be the end of the first wave of women suffrage activism in China.

Aftermath
During the Presidency of Yuan Shikai and the following years of fragmentation in China, no national women's movement was possible. In some parts of China, however, local women's movements organised after the foundation of Nujie lianhe hui (UWA) in 1919, and managed to introduce women suffrage in the local constitutions of Hunan and Guangdong (1921) and Sichuan (1923), were women were elected to the local parliaments.  When China was unified under the Kuomintang Government in Nanjing in 1928, a national women's movement could organise again for the first time since the closure of the Nüzi canzheng tongmenghui in 1913, and women's suffrage was finally included in the new Constitution of 1936, although the constitution was not implemented until 1947.

References 

Women's suffrage in China
1912 establishments in China
Women's organizations based in China
Feminism in China
Women's rights organizations
Feminist organizations in China